Ghulam Rabbani may refer to the following people:

Gulam Rabbani Taban (1914–1992), Indian lawyer and poet
Ghulam Rabbani Agro (1933–2010), Pakistani writer
Haji Ghulam Rabbani (1936–2008), Pakistani businessman and politician
Golam Rabbani (Joypurhat politician) (died 2011), Bangladeshi politician from Joypurhat
Golam Rabbani (Netrokona politician), Bangladeshi politician
Md. Golam Rabbani (born 1958), Bangladeshi politician from Chapai Nawabganj
Ghulam Noor Rabbani Khar, Pakistani politician
Abdul Al-Rahim Ghulam Rabbani (born c. 1969), Pakistani citizen held by the US military at the Guantanamo camps in Cuba
Mohammed Ahmad Ghulam Rabbani (born c. 1970), Pakistani citizen held by the US military at the Guantanamo camps in Cuba